Relocation services, employee relocation, military Permanent Change of Station (PCS) or workforce mobility include a range of internal business processes to transfer employees, their families, and/or entire departments of a business to a new location. Like other types of employee benefits, these processes are usually administered by human resources specialists within a corporation. In the military, these processes are administered by the Transportation Management Office (TMO) and Personal Property Shipping Office (PPSO).

Such business processes can include domestic residential services where an employee moves within a country or state as well as international relocation services which include planning for diplomats, managers, etc. working abroad. An agency providing relocation services directs and manages the process of relocation including arranging necessary documents (visa, long-term stay permissions), finding a new house (accommodation), finding a school for children (education), finding a job for the partner or "trailing spouse", arranging a teacher for the family (language training) and introduce expatriates to the local culture.

International relocations
Dating back to the Dutch East India Company, sending an employee to work in another country (sometimes called a "global assignment" in current HR jargon) has carried considerable costs while theoretically opening the potential for financial returns for the employer.

With tax equalization, housing allowance, cost-of-living adjustment, and other benefits, the typical expatriate compensation package is two to three times the home-country base salary. For example, an expatriate with a €100,000 annual salary will cost the employer €200,000-300,000 per year incl. the relocation costs.  Shorter term assignments have lower costs, especially when they avoid taxation thresholds.

Reasons why a company might give an employee a global assignment include filling functional needs, developing the employee for upper management, and developing the company itself. Anne-Wil Harzing of the University of Melbourne further categorizes these employees as "bears,
bumblebees and spiders". Those playing the role of bears are the long arm of headquarters control.
The bumblebees transfer (cross-pollinate) their corporate culture. Harzing's spiders weave the
informal communication networks so important in connecting far-flung branches, subsidiaries and
all strategic partners.

Responding to a 2005 survey of global assignment management practices commissioned by a US-based third-party relocation management company, 31 percent of surveyed employers indicated that they track exceptions on a per-assignment basis for budgetary purposes, 23 percent track exception on an overall basis in order to identify policy components that need review, and 39 percent do not track the cost or type of exceptions granted. (Seven percent were not able to answer the question.)

Depending on the size and organization of a company, different departments, such as finance or human resources, may administer the relocation program. Some may lack any formal programs while others have highly structured processes. Moreover, different operating units may administer different aspects of the program.

Some may manage and execute all of their relocation processes in-house while others outsource them. This is done to save time, focusing internal resources on company workforce strengths, or for providing better service to each transferee.

Of the companies participating in the 2005 Survey of Global Assignment Management Practices, 43 percent indicated that they either outsource or co-source some assignment management services (staffing 1:58 assignees, 7 percent declined to answer).

See also

 Moving company
 Worldwide ERC – Relocation services trade group

References

Moving companies
Moving and relocation